Jasper is a specialized municipality and townsite in western Alberta within the Canadian Rockies. The townsite is in the Athabasca River valley and is the commercial centre of Jasper National Park.

History 

Established in 1813, Jasper House was first a fur trade outpost of the North West Company, and later Hudson's Bay Company, on the York Factory Express trade route to what was then called "New Caledonia" (now British Columbia) and Fort Vancouver on the lower Columbia River. Jasper House was 35 km north of today's town of Jasper.

Jasper Forest Park was established in 1907. The railway siding at the location of the future townsite was established by the Grand Trunk Pacific Railway in 1911 and originally named Fitzhugh after a Grand Trunk vice president (along the Grand Trunk's "alphabet" line). The Canadian Northern Railway began service to its Jasper Park station in 1912, about 700 m from GTP's Fitzhugh station. The townsite was surveyed in 1913 by H. Matheson. It was renamed Jasper after the former fur trade post. An internment camp was set up at Dominion Park in Jasper from February 1916 to August 1916.

Jasper Forest Park was renamed Jasper National Park in 1930. By 1931, Jasper was accessible by road from Edmonton. In 1940, the scenic Icefields Parkway opened, connecting Jasper to Lake Louise and Banff in Banff National Park.

The first step towards incorporation of Jasper occurred on August 31, 1995, when the Jasper Improvement District was formed from a portion of Improvement District No. 12 (Jasper National Park). The improvement district was subsequently incorporated as a specialized municipality under the name of the Municipality of Jasper on July 20, 2001. The incorporation order established the Jasper townsite as the Town of Jasper and the surrounding balance of the specialized municipality as a rural service area that was deemed equivalent to a municipal district.

Geography 

The Municipality of Jasper is in the western portion of the province of Alberta within Jasper National Park. It borders the province of British Columbia to the west and Improvement District No. 12 to the north, east, and south. The Athabasca River, which originates from the Columbia Icefield, meanders northward through the municipality. The Miette River, Maligne River, and Snaring River all discharge into the Athabasca River within the Municipality of Jasper's limits.

It is near the confluence of the Athabasca River and Miette River. It lies between the Victoria Cross Ranges (northwest), Pyramid Mountain (north), Maligne Range (southeast) and Trident Ridge (southwest). Lakes near the Jasper townsite include Pyramid Lake, Patricia Lake, Lake Annette, Lake Edith, Lac Beauvert, Maligne Lake, and Medicine Lake.

Localities 
The following localities are located within the Municipality of Jasper.

Bedson
Decoigne
Geikie
Henry House
Jasper
Jasper Lodge
Jasper National Park
Jasper Park Lodge
Medicine Lake
Miette Hot Springs
Sixth Bridge
Wynd

Climate 
Jasper experiences a borderline Humid Continental/Subarctic climate (Köppen climate classification Dfb/Dfc).

Summers in Jasper are pleasant, with daily highs usually around 21.1 °C (70 °F) and lows around 7.2 °C (45 °F). Winters are cold, though may be considered mild by Canadian standards, with daily highs around −2.2 °C (28 °F) and lows around −11.7 °C (11 °F).

Demographics 

The population of the Municipality of Jasper according to its 2011 municipal census is 5,236, a change of 10.3% over its 2008 municipal census population of 4,745. Jasper's 2011 population of 5,236 comprises 4,584 permanent and 652 non-permanent residents, while its 2007 census counted 4,235 permanent and 510 non-permanent residents.

Attractions 
The Fairmont Jasper Park Lodge, the Marmot Basin ski resort, and the Jasper Skytram, which carries visitors to The Whistlers' summit, are all near the townsite. Within the Jasper townsite are the Jasper Visitor Centre and the Jasper-Yellowhead Museum and Archives.

Government 
Governance of Jasper is shared between the municipality and Parks Canada, an agency of the federal government.

Infrastructure

Transportation 

Jasper railway station is served by Via Rail with two passenger services. The Canadian and the Jasper–Prince Rupert train both operate three times per week.

Education 
Jasper's educational services are provided by:

Grande Yellowhead Public School Division No. 77
Jasper Elementary School (K–6 English & French Immersion)
Jasper Junior Senior High School (7–12 English & French Immersion)
Greater North Central Francophone Education Region No. 2

 École Desrochers (K–12)

Media 
Newspapers
 Jasper Fitzhugh (locally-owned weekly)
 The Local (locally owned weekly)
Radio

Television

Sister cities 
 Hakone, Kanagawa, since July 4, 1972

Notable people 
 Ian Herbers, NHL hockey player
 John Hilworth, NHL hockey player
 Erin Karpluk, actress
 Loni Klettl, Olympic Alpine skier - 1980 Lake Placid downhill
 Wyatt Tremblay, editorial cartoonist
 Kirby Morrow (1973–2020), voice actor known for roles such as Miroku from InuYasha, Hot Shot from Transformers: Cybertron, and Cole from Ninjago
 Brian Young, NHL hockey player

See also 

Jasper to Banff Relay
List of communities in Alberta
List of historic places in Alberta's Rockies
List of specialized municipalities in Alberta

References

External links 

 
1813 establishments in Canada
1995 establishments in Alberta
Hudson's Bay Company trading posts
Jasper National Park
Populated places established in 1813
Specialized municipalities in Alberta